Second Ending is a science fiction novel by northern Irish writer James White, published in June 1961.  It first appeared in Fantastic Stories of Imagination edited by Cele Goldsmith and publish by Ziff Davis.

Short listed for the Hugo Award, it tells the story of the only human survivor on Earth after a series of nuclear wars, accompanied by a robot and a group of androids.

References 

1961 British novels
1961 science fiction novels
British science fiction novels
Novels by James White (author)
Ace Books books
British novellas